Samuel Goodwin Vance (30 March 1879 – 16 May 1947) was a Canadian sport shooter who competed in the 1920 Summer Olympics and in the 1924 Summer Olympics.

In 1920 he finished fifth with the Canadian team in the team clay pigeons competition. He also participated in the individual trap event but his place is unknown. Four years later he won the silver medal as member of the Canadian team in the team clay pigeons competition. In the individual trap event he finished sixth.

References

External links
Samuel Vance's profile at databaseOlympics
Samuel Vance at the Trapshooting Hall of Fame

1879 births
1947 deaths
Canadian male sport shooters
Olympic shooters of Canada
Shooters at the 1920 Summer Olympics
Shooters at the 1924 Summer Olympics
Olympic silver medalists for Canada
Trap and double trap shooters
Olympic medalists in shooting
Medalists at the 1924 Summer Olympics
20th-century Canadian people